Austin v. Michigan Chamber of Commerce, 494 U.S. 652 (1990), is a United States corporate law case of the Supreme Court of the United States holding that the Michigan Campaign Finance Act, which prohibited corporations from using treasury money to make independent expenditures to support or oppose candidates in elections, did not violate the First and Fourteenth Amendments. The Court upheld the restriction on corporate speech, stating, "Corporate wealth can unfairly influence elections"; however, the Michigan law still allowed the corporation to make such expenditures from a segregated fund.

Background
The Michigan Campaign Finance Act banned corporations from spending treasury money on "independent expenditures to support or oppose candidates in elections for state offices." The Act had one loophole-if a corporation had an independent fund solely used for political purposes the law did not apply. The Michigan Chamber of Commerce sought to use its general funds to publish an advertisement in a local newspaper to support a candidate for the Michigan House of Representatives,

Opinion of the Court
Louis J. Caruso, Lansing, Michigan, argued on the side of the appellants (Austin). Richard D. McLellan, Lansing, Michigan, argued for the respondent (Michigan Chamber of Commerce).

In an opinion by Justice Marshall, the Court held the Act did not violate the First or the Fourteenth Amendments. The Court recognized a state's compelling interest in combating a "different type of corruption in the political arena: the corrosive and distorting effects of immense aggregations of wealth that are accumulated with the help of the corporate form and that have little or no correlation to the public's support for the corporation's political ideas."

Marshall concluded by noting the importance of the Act: 

Marshall was joined in the majority opinion by Chief Justice William Rehnquist and Justices William Brennan, Byron White, Harry Blackmun, and John Paul Stevens. Justice Kennedy wrote a dissenting opinion, joined by Justices Scalia and O'Connor.

Subsequent developments 
The decision was overruled by Citizens United v. Federal Election Commission, 558 U.S. 50 (2010), ruling that the First Amendment right of free speech applied to corporations.

See also
United States corporate law
 List of United States Supreme Court cases, volume 494
 List of United States Supreme Court cases
 Lists of United States Supreme Court cases by volume
 List of United States Supreme Court cases by the Rehnquist Court
 Appearance of corruption
 Citizens United v. Federal Election Commission (2010)

References

External links
 

United States Supreme Court cases
United States Supreme Court cases of the Rehnquist Court
United States elections case law
1990 in United States case law
Overruled United States Supreme Court decisions
Legal history of Michigan